Irinel Popescu, M.D. (born on 22 April 1953, Filiași) is a Romanian surgeon.

Career
Popescu studied medicine at Carol Davila University of Medicine and Pharmacy in Bucharest and graduated in 1977. He became a Specialist Surgeon in 1983, and in 1990 he became a General Surgeon, obtaining a PhD from Carol Davila University. In 1997, Popescu, along with a group of other scientists, established Romtransplant, a professional organization for raising awareness of the importance of organs transplantation through several arranged national congresses. He teaches in the Faculty of Medicine of Carol Davila University.

He became known in Romania after being performing the country's first liver transplant in 2000. In the following years, he performed and oversaw more than 450 liver transplants and 1,500 liver resections. He was also nominated to be the Expert of the European Council in matters of transplants. 

From 2004 to 2008, Popescu served as a senator in the Parliament of Romania, representing the Conservator Party in Dolj County. He served as Chairman of National Education Committee, and in 2006 he established the Romanian Association of Hepato-biliary-pancreatic and Liver Transplantation. In 2013, Popescu was elected to serve as a corresponding member of the Romanian Academy.

Awards and honors 
 Member of the Romanian Academy of Sciences
 Honoris Causa of the University of Medicine and Pharmacy Craiova
 Honoris Causa of Ovidius University of Constanța
 Honorary Professor position at Ovidius University of Constanța
 Honorary Professor position at the Faculty of Medicine and Pharmacy of Târgu Mureș
 Order of the Star of Romania, Grand Cross Rank
 Romanian Award for Outstanding Achievement 
 Member of Ten for Romania

Board and organizational leadership positions
 President of 17th World Congress of the International Association of Surgeons, Gastroenterologists and Oncologist
 President of the 8th Symposiums and Postgraduate Courses of Romanian Section of IASC
 Deputy Editor of the "Archives de l'Union Medicale Balkanique" ("Archives of the Balkan Medical Union")

References

External links
Irinel Popescu: Un virtuoz al bisturiului .
 Site Irinel Popescu
 Irinel Popescu: România ar putea ajunge pe primele locuri în lume privind transplanturile hepatice
 Irinel Popescu: 2013, anul Romaniei la transplant; rata de donare depinde de acceptul familiei
 Chirurgul nu mai este singur. Dialog cu Irinel Popescu

1953 births
Living people
People from Filiași
Romanian transplant surgeons
Carol Davila University of Medicine and Pharmacy alumni
Conservative Party (Romania) politicians
Members of the Senate of Romania
Honorary members of the Academy of Sciences of Moldova
Grand Crosses of the Order of the Star of Romania
Academic staff of the Carol Davila University of Medicine and Pharmacy